Pseudocatharylla allecto is a moth in the family Crambidae. It was described by Graziano Bassi in 1999. It is found in the Democratic Republic of the Congo.

References

Crambinae
Moths described in 1999
Endemic fauna of the Democratic Republic of the Congo